Wings is a freeware video game (originally shareware) created by Miika Virpioja. A 2D, DOS-based computer game with space ships that behave like lunar landers. The player can select one of 33 weapons, and the surroundings can be destroyed. The game includes multiplayer capabilities, either through linked PCs or two or more players using one keyboard plus gamepads/joysticks. In the original shareware version certain weapons were locked until the game was registered. The game includes a level editor.

The game featured a number of module files as soundtrack. One of them, "januski.s3m", was an original composition by Juha Lehtioksa, guitarist of the Finnish gothic metal band Silentium, and bears a very strong resemblance to the band's song Forever Sleep on the album Infinita Plango Vulnera, released in 1999. While the track had initially been used without permission and even credited to another person, Lehtioksa had nothing against using his song in the game—in fact, he even liked the idea of having the track on Wings's soundtrack—but after receiving a number of enquiries regarding the song over the years, some of them very hostile in nature, he finally asked Virpioja to remove it from the game.

References

External links
 Wings official homepage
 Wings 2 official homepage - Sequel to Wings, public 1.2 version released 10th of June 2007.

1996 video games
2006 video games
DOS games
DOS-only games
Video games developed in Finland